Into the Arms of Strangers: Stories of the Kindertransport is a 2000 documentary film about the British rescue operation known as the Kindertransport, which saved the lives of over 10,000 Jewish and other children from Nazi Germany, Austria, Czechoslovakia, and Danzig by transporting them via train, boat, and plane to Great Britain. These children, or Kinder in German, were taken into foster homes and hostels in Britain, expecting eventually to be reunited with their parents. The majority of them never saw their families again. Written and directed by Mark Jonathan Harris, produced by Deborah Oppenheimer, narrated by Judi Dench, and made with the cooperation of the United States Holocaust Memorial Museum, it utilized rare and extensive footage, photographs, and artifacts, and is told in the words of the child survivors, rescuers, parents, and foster parents.

The film received numerous accolades, including winning the Academy Award for Best Documentary Feature.

The film was released on DVD and VHS on August 28, 2001 by Warner Home Video.

In 2014, the film was selected for preservation in the United States National Film Registry by the Library of Congress as being "culturally, historically, or aesthetically significant".

Interviewed subjects 
The documentary features filmed interviews in which the children of the Kindertransport (aged in their 60s and 70s at the time of the filming) recall their feelings and experiences. These interview subjects include:

Lorraine Allard, Kind
Lory Cahn, Kind
Mariam Cohen, foster mother of Kurt Fuchel
Hedy Epstein, Kind
Kurt Fuchel, Kind
Abrascha Gorbulski, Alexander Gordon, Kind, Dunera Boy, British Army Sergeant (1941-1947)
Franzi Groszmann, mother of Lore Segal
Eva Hayman, Kind
Jack Hellman, Kind
Bertha Leverton, Kind
Ursula Rosenfeld, Kind
Inge Sadan, Kind (Bertha Leverton's sister)
Lore Segal, Kind
Robert Sugar, Kind
Nicholas Winton, rescuer
Norbert Wollheim, rescuer

Reactions
Into the Arms of Strangers: Stories of the Kindertransport has an approval rating of 91% on review aggregator website Rotten Tomatoes, based on 35 reviews, and an average rating of 7.68/10. The website's critical consensus states, "Although it appears to be nothing more than a "talking heads" documentary you may see on TV, Into the Arms of Strangers, nonetheless, tells a heart-wrenching story". Metacritic assigned the film a weighted average score of 79 out of 100, based on 25 critics, indicating "generally favorable reviews". The film had a limited theatrical release (18 theaters at its widest) and grossed $382,807 domestically.

In 2014, Into the Arms of Strangers: Stories of the Kindertransport was deemed "culturally, historically, or aesthetically significant" by the Library of Congress and selected for preservation for all time in the National Film Registry.

In 2000, Into the Arms of Strangers: Stories of the Kindertransport won the Evening Standard Award for Best Documentary.

See also 
The Children Who Cheated the Nazis
The Power of Good: Nicholas Winton
List of Holocaust films

References

External links
 
 
Into the Arms of Strangers official website
The U.S. Holocaust Memorial Museum Kindertransport page
Deborah Oppenheimer website

2000 films
2000 documentary films
American documentary films
Documentary films about children in the Holocaust
Documentary films about child refugees
Best Documentary Feature Academy Award winners
Films directed by Mark Jonathan Harris
Films scored by Lee Holdridge
Kindertransport
United States National Film Registry films
2000s English-language films
2000s American films